The 2016 United States House of Representatives elections in Kentucky were held on November 8, 2016, to elect the six U.S. representatives from the state of Kentucky, one from each of the state's six congressional districts. The elections coincided with the 2016 presidential election, as well as other elections to the House of Representatives, elections to the United States Senate and various state and local elections. The primaries were held on May 17.

District 1

Republican Ed Whitfield, who had served 11 terms, did not run for re-election for a 12th term. Republicans James Comer, the Agriculture Commissioner of Kentucky, and Michael Pape, Witfield's district director, ran for the Republican Party nomination. Other potential Republican candidates included former Lieutenant Governor of Kentucky nominee Robbie Rudolph, businessman Todd P'Pool, George W. Bush administration official J. Scott Jennings, and Whitfield's chief of staff Cory Hicks. State Senator Max Wise also was considered a potential candidate, but he endorsed Comer. In the May 17th primary, Comer won with 61% of the vote and went on to face Democrat Sam Gaskins in the general election.

Special election
Whitfield resigned on September 6, 2016.  A special election was held on November 8, concurrently with the regularly-scheduled election.

Candidates

Republican
Declared
 James Comer, former Kentucky Agriculture Commissioner and candidate for governor in 2015

Democratic
Declared
 Sam Gaskins, construction worker

Republican primary

Candidates
Declared
 James Comer, former Kentucky Agriculture Commissioner and candidate for governor in 2015
 Jason Batts, Hickman County Attorney
 Michael Pape, district director for Congressman Ed Whitfield
 Miles A. Caughey Jr.

Declined
 Ed Whitfield, incumbent U.S. Congressman (endorsed Pape) 
 Max Wise, state senator (endorsed Comer)
 Todd P'Pool, former Hopkins County Attorney and nominee for attorney general in 2011
 Cory Hicks, former chief of staff to Congressman Ed Whitfield
 J. Scott Jennings, former White House aide
 Robbie Rudolph, businessman, former secretary of Executive Cabinet, former State Secretary of Finance and nominee for lieutenant governor in 2007

Results

Democratic primary

Candidates
Declared
 Sam Gaskins, construction worker

Withdrew
Tom Osborne, attorney

Declined
 John Tilley, Secretary of the Kentucky Department of Justice and Public Safety and former state representative
 Dorsey Ridley, state senator
 Gerald Watkins, state representative
 Brandi Harless, vice chair of the Kentucky Democratic Party and co-founder and CEO of Personal Medicine Plus
 David Ramey, chair of the Calloway County Democratic Party

General election

Results

District 2

Republican Brett Guthrie had represented the district since being elected in 2008 and filed to run for re-election.

General election

Results

District 3

Democrat John Yarmuth had represented the district since being elected in 2006 and filed to run for re-election.

Republican primary
Republicans Harold Bratcher, Everett Corley and Robert DeVore Jr. competed in the May primary for the chance to challenge Yarmuth.

Candidates
 Harold Bratcher
 Everett Corley
 Robert DeVore Jr.

Results

General election

Results

District 4

Republican Thomas Massie had represented the district since being elected in 2012 and filed to run for re-election. Calvin Sidle, who formerly ran for Pikeville City Commissioner, ran for the Democratic nomination.

General election

Results

District 5

Republican Hal Rogers had represented the district since being elected in 1980 and filed to run for re-election. He was be challenged by Republican John Burk Jr.

Republican primary

Candidates
 Hal Rogers, Incumbent Congressman
 John Burk, Jr.

Results

General election

Results

District 6

Republican Andy Barr had represented the district since being elected in 2012 and filed to run for re-election. He was challenged in the May primary by Roger Brill. 

Matt Jones, host and founder of Kentucky Sports Radio, considered challenging Representative Barr, but announced on November 23, 2015, that he would not do so. Rev. Nancy Jo Kemper, a graduate of Yale Divinity School and former executive director of the Kentucky Council of Churches, announced she would run for the Democratic nomination on January 21, 2016. She had the support of former Lt. Governor Crit Luallen, State Senator Reggie Thomas, State Representative Susan Westrom, and Secretary of State Alison Lundergan Grimes. Geoff Young, candidate for governor in Kentucky in 2014, and Michael Coblenz, a candidate for Kentucky state house in 2010 competed with Kemper for the chance to challenge Barr in the general election. Michael Coblenz later withdrew, leaving Rev. Kemper and Young as the only Democratic candidates.

Republican primary

Candidates
 Andy Barr, Incumbent Congressman
 Roger Brill

Results

Democratic primary

Candidates
 Nancy Jo Kemper
 Geoffrey "Geoff" M. Young

Results

General election

Results

References

External links
U.S. House elections in Kentucky, 2016 at Ballotpedia
Campaign contributions at OpenSecrets

Kentucky
2016
United States House